Jamieson and Spearl was a St. Louis, Missouri architectural firm that designed most of the buildings built at Washington University in St. Louis and the University of Missouri in Columbia between 1912 and 1950.

Biography
James Paterson Jamieson (1867–1941) was born in Falkirk, Scotland.  He studied for two years at the School of the South Kensington Museum and then emigrated to the U.S. in 1884 and spent two years with a firm in Minneapolis, Minnesota. He then joined his brother Thomas Paterson Jamieson in an architectural practice R.G. Kennedy.  In 1889 he served as a draftsman at Cope and Stewardson.  He received the first University of Pennsylvania Traveling Scholarship to study in Europe at the Victoria and Albert Museum.

He was sent to St. Louis to supervise the construction of the firm's design of buildings at Washington University's hilltop campus in preparation for the 1904 St. Louis World's Fair.

After Cope's death in 1902 he returned to Philadelphia but continued to maintain a practice in St. Louis.  In 1912 he formed his own practice was joined in 1918 by George Spearl (died 1948), another Scottish-born Cope alumni.

The firm continued to operate into the 1950s after the death of its principals.

Projects

University of Missouri
Among the 20 buildings at the University of Missouri are:
Faurot Field
Ellis Library
Memorial Union
Rothwell Gymnasium
Read Hall
Mumford Hall
Brewer Field House
KOMU-TV studios (after the principals' deaths)
Jesse Auditorium (1953 renovation)
President's House

University of Arkansas
1925 Plan
Engineering Hall - 1927
Agriculture Building - 1927
Chi Omega Greek Theatre - 1930
Vol Walker Hall - 1935
Chemistry Building - 1936

Washington University
Danforth Campus (most buildings between 1912 and 1950s)

Princeton University
Blair Hall (1897)

Pomona College

Holmes Hall
Harwood Court (1919-1921)
Crookshank Hall of Zoology (1922)
Mason Hall of Chemistry (1923)

References

Companies based in St. Louis
Architecture firms based in Missouri